Robert William Behning is a Republican member of the Indiana House of Representatives. He represents House District 91, which includes portions of Marion and Hendricks counties. He was born and raised in Indianapolis. In 1976, he received a Bachelor of Science degree from Indiana University.

In 2011, Behning authored legislation creating the School Choice Scholarship program, providing families who do not have the financial means to pay the cost of tuition at a private school with a scholarship (or voucher).

Behning currently works at Marian University as the Director of External Affairs for the Educators College. He is married to Rosalie.

References

External links
State Representative Robert Behning official Indiana State Legislature site
 

1954 births
Living people
Republican Party members of the Indiana House of Representatives
Politicians from Indianapolis
Indiana University Bloomington alumni
21st-century American politicians